In enzymology, a nucleoside ribosyltransferase is an enzyme that catalyzes the chemical reaction

D-ribosyl-base1 + base2  D-ribosyl-base2 + base1

Thus, the two substrates of this enzyme are D-ribosyl-base1 and base2, whereas its two products are D-ribosyl-base2 and base1.

This enzyme belongs to the family of glycosyltransferases, specifically the pentosyltransferases.  The systematic name of this enzyme class is nucleoside:purine(pyrimidine) D-ribosyltransferase. This enzyme is also called nucleoside N-ribosyltransferase.

References 

 

EC 2.4.2
Enzymes of unknown structure